Moneague is a small town in Saint Ann, Jamaica on the main road between Kingston and Ocho Rios.

In the colonial days, the town prospered as a stopover for the rich English on their journey.

Moneague is the location of the Jamaica Defence Force Moneague Training Camp originally developed by the British for the West India Regiment. This facility includes an airstrip.

The main attractions in the town are Moneague College (which is housed in the former colonial-era Moneague Hotel) and Moneague Lake. In 2006, the lake became the subject of headline news as it flooded its banks, destroying much local property.

References

External links
Jamaica Defense Force Moneague Training Camp
Official Jamaican Tourist Board's page on Moneague

Populated places in Saint Ann Parish